Sharon Musson (born 13 December 1969) is a New Zealand swimmer. She competed in two events at the 1988 Summer Olympics.

References

External links
 

1969 births
Living people
New Zealand female swimmers
Olympic swimmers of New Zealand
Swimmers at the 1988 Summer Olympics
Sportspeople from Upper Hutt